Wasted Pieces is the third solo album released by Lou Barlow as "Lou B's Acoustic Sentridoh"; "Sentridoh" is his solo home recording project; it was released by Shrimper Records in 1993 as cassette; in 2003 it was re-released as CD as "Lou B's Wasted Pieces '87-'93" that collects the bulk of the tracks from Wasted Pieces and Most of the Worst and Some of the Best tapes.

Track listing

1993 cassette release

2003 CD release 
Pooh Piece - 02:56
Stiff To Rhythm - 01:06
Broken II - 02:08
Untitled - 01:30
Nitemare - 01:59
Untitled - 00:47
Be Nice Me - 01:25
Never Tried - 01:45
J.O.J. '91 - 01:42
Rather Die - 01:15
God Won't Let You Die - 01:10
Saliva Drips - 01:37
Albequerqe '89 - 01:38
Abandon - 00:35
No Way At All - 01:44
I Know Before... - 02:54
It Might Be - 01:00
Old Man - 01:04
I Can't Wait - 01:57
Suede - 01:13
Raise Your Head - 02:25
Raise The Bells - 02:09
Conspiracy - 01:14
Untitled - 00:36
Fun-pool - 00:20
Why We Swing - 00:37
Nothing Lasts - 02:43
Heartness Crane - 01:52
Organ - 02:25
Cello - 01:05
End - 01:04

References

1993 albums
Sentridoh albums
Shrimper Records albums